The 2013 Sydney to Hobart Yacht Race, sponsored by Rolex and hosted by the Cruising Yacht Club of Australia in Sydney, New South Wales, is the 69th annual running of the "blue water classic" Sydney to Hobart Yacht Race. The 2013 edition began on Sydney Harbour at 1pm on Boxing Day (26 December 2013), before heading south for  through the Tasman Sea, past Bass Strait, into Storm Bay and up the River Derwent, to cross the finish line in Hobart, Tasmania.

Line honours were claimed by Wild Oats XI in a time of 2 days, 6 hours, 7 minutes and 27 seconds. It was the yacht's seventh win, equaling Morna's (now Kurrewa IV's) 1960 record for most line honours victories. Victoire was awarded the Tattersall's Cup.

94 starters left the harbour and 84 crossed the finish line.

Results

Line honours (first 10)

Handicap results (Top 10)

References

Sydney to Hobart Yacht Race
Sydney
Sydney
December 2013 sports events in Australia